Ricardo van der Ende (born 13 July 1979 in Poeldijk) is a Dutch racing driver. He won the 2001 Formula Chrysler Euroseries season with the Belgian team of Vortex Motorsport. He also won the Winter Series of the British Formula Ford Championship in 1998 and the Formula Ford Festival in 1999. Later on he went karting and became Dutch champion of the Dutch Rotax Max Challenge in 2003. In 2004 he became European and French karting champion of ICC 125cc. He switched to single-seat race cars in 2004. In 2005 he began touring car racing, and drove the Dutch BMW 130i Cup in 2006. He placed second that year. In 2007 van der Ende was crowned champion. In 2009 he competed in the Dutch GT4 Championship with a BMW M3 GT4, where he came in 2nd in the final ranking. 2009 was less successful for van der Ende, and he finished 6th in the Dutch GT4 Championship. In 2011 he came back to win the Dutch title. In the final race of the 2011 season he earned the GT4 European Cup as well, edging out Stefano D'Aste, who finished 2nd.

References

External links
 
 

1979 births
Living people
People from Monster
Dutch racing drivers
Formula Ford drivers
British Formula Renault 2.0 drivers
Dutch Formula Renault 2.0 drivers
Formula Renault 2.0 NEC drivers
ADAC GT Masters drivers
Sportspeople from South Holland

MP Motorsport drivers
Nürburgring 24 Hours drivers
24H Series drivers
GT4 European Series drivers